This article contains a list of mayors of Gulfport, Mississippi, United States.

List

References 

 
Gulfport